The Caproni Ca.146 was a high-wing reconnaissance aircraft built by Caproni in the mid-1930s.

Design
The Ca.146 was a derivative of the Ca.127, and was similar in being a high-wing monoplane. However, the Ca.146 was of all-wood construction and had no armament provisions. The Ca.146 prototype (registration MM.131) flew in 1935 and showed good flight characteristics, but won no orders from the Regia Aeronautica.

Specifications

References

Ca.146
Aircraft first flown in 1935
High-wing aircraft
Single-engined tractor aircraft